Knox Township is the name of some places in the U.S. state of Pennsylvania:

Knox Township, Clarion County, Pennsylvania
Knox Township, Clearfield County, Pennsylvania
Knox Township, Jefferson County, Pennsylvania

Pennsylvania township disambiguation pages